Benjamin David Hall (born August 9, 1983) is an American college baseball coach and former second baseman. He is the head baseball coach at North Carolina Agricultural and Technical State University. He played college baseball at Stetson University, Daytona State College and Clemson University from 2003 to 2006.

Head coaching record

See also
 List of current NCAA Division I baseball coaches

References

1983 births
Living people
Baseball second basemen
Stetson Hatters baseball players
Daytona State Falcons baseball players
Clemson Tigers baseball players
People from Johnson City, Tennessee
Wingate Bulldogs baseball coaches
Winthrop Eagles baseball coaches
North Carolina A&T Aggies baseball coaches
Wingate University alumni